Canada Peak is a sharp peak rising to  on the west side of Canada Glacier where it spills into Taylor Valley, Victoria Land. It was named by the New Zealand Geographic Board in 1998, in association with Canada Glacier.

References
 

Mountains of Victoria Land
McMurdo Dry Valleys